
Gmina Czarnocin is a rural gmina (administrative district) in Piotrków County, Łódź Voivodeship, in central Poland.

Villages
Gmina Czarnocin contains the villages and settlements of Bieżywody, Biskupia Wola, Budy Szynczyckie, Czarnocin, Dalków, Grabina Wola, Kalska Wola, Rzepki, Szynczyce, Tychów, Wola Kutowa, Zamość and Zawodzie.

Neighbouring gminas
Gmina Czarnocin is bordered by the gminas of Będków, Brójce, Moszczenica and Tuszyn.

References
Polish official population figures 2006

Czarnocin
Piotrków County